Ross A. Isaacs is a game designer who has worked primarily on role-playing games.
He had done a scattering of freelance work for Alderac Entertainment Group and Chaosium before doing more extensive work for Holistic Designs. Isaacs contributed to Chaosium's Nephilim line, and ended up at Last Unicorn Games (LUG) shortly thereafter. As a new employee at LUG, he did the initial work on the "Icon" system for their Star Trek games, and after the design of Icon was done, he was made line developer for the Star Trek: The Next Generation Role-playing Game (1998). Isaacs remained with Last Unicorn when the company was bought first by Wizards of the Coast and then by Decipher, Inc. and in February 2001 Decipher offered the remaining Last Unicorn staff jobs in their new roleplaying department. Isaacs eventually returned to New York.

References

External links
 

Living people
Role-playing game designers
Year of birth missing (living people)